"Only Yesterday" is a song recorded by the Carpenters. Released on March 14, 1975, the song was composed by Richard Carpenter, Kōji Makaino and John Bettis. "Only Yesterday" peaked at number four on the Billboard Hot 100 and number one on the Adult Contemporary (AC) charts, The Carpenters' eleventh number one on that chart.

Cash Box called it a "ballad with its infectious beat" and that "Karen's dulcet, multi-tracked vocals soar over a dynamic arrangement which should be buzzing over the airwaves for a long time." 

The song was The Carpenters' last top-ten single on the Billboard Hot 100—though they would have nine more top-ten singles on the  AC charts, ending with AC number seven "Make Believe It's Your First Time", a few months after Karen's death in 1983.

The music video features some footage of Karen and Richard at work in the studio. After Karen sang the line, "the promise of morning light", it faded from the studio to a fountain in Huntington Library Gardens in San Marino, California. It then featured some footage of a red moon bridge, which was roped off to the general public, in the Japanese Garden at Huntington Library.

Personnel
Karen Carpenter – lead and backing vocals
Richard Carpenter – backing vocals, piano, Wurlitzer electronic piano, Fender Rhodes electric piano, orchestration
Joe Osborn – bass guitar
Tony Peluso – guitar
Jim Gordon – drums
Bob Messenger – tenor saxophone
Earle Dumler – oboe
Uncredited – percussion

Chart performance

Weekly charts

Year-end charts

See also
List of number-one adult contemporary singles of 1975 (U.S.)

References

Bibliography
The Billboard Book of Top 40 Hits, 6th Edition, 1996

External links
 

1975 singles
The Carpenters songs
Oricon International Singles Chart number-one singles
Songs with lyrics by John Bettis
Songs written by Richard Carpenter (musician)
A&M Records singles
1975 songs
Songs written by Kōji Makaino